The Lucas Oil Off Road Racing Series, also known as LOORRS, was a short course off-road racing series in the United States and also in Mexico beginning in 2015. The series featured events in Arizona, California, Nevada, Missouri and hosted a weekend of racing in Ensenada, Mexico at Baja International Short Course near Estero Beach. The title sponsor for the series was Lucas Oil Products, whom also owned, sanctioned, and operated the series.  It effectively replaced the CORR series starting in 2009.

History
There were two large sanctioning bodies in short course off-road racing for 2008: CORR and WSORR.  CORR had been sanctioning events on the West Coast and WSORR had sanctioned Midwestern events.  CORR closed before the end of the 2008 season and canceled its final two racing weekends. LOORRS took over the sanctioning of most of the West Coast events, and TORC: The Off-Road Championship, took over most of the Midwestern events.

The LOORRS series was founded for the 2009 season by Lucas Oil and its head Forrest Lucas. Carl Renezeder made short course off-road racing history in 2009 when he won the Unlimited 2 and Unlimited 4 class to become the first driver to win seven national championships.

In December 2012, LOORRS announced that Ritchie Lewis would be taking over as the series' director. He announced the 2013 series schedule; it would continue racing at most of the same tracks. He also announced that Lucas would be building tracks at San Angelo, Texas and Lucas Oil Speedway to be used in 2014.

In December 2018, the series announced plans to create a historic and long-awaited short course unification race  to take place in June 2019 at Lucas Oil Speedway. Regular LOORRS Racers competing against the Lucas Oil Midwest Short Course League Racers with drivers from each series would be able to win points for their respective championships. Unfortunately an untimely tornado wreaked havoc in the area and severely damaged the track forcing official to cancel the event.

In June 2020, LOORRS cancelled the Pro 4 series races for the 2020 season as team participation was anticipated to be low. Rockstar Energy Drink didn't renew their sponsorship of the series or for two top Pro 4 teams of Rob MacCachren and R.J. Anderson. Kyle LeDuc decided to participate only in the Midwestern series.

On Thursday November 12, 2020 Lucas Oil announced it would effectively fold the series due to the ongoing COVID-19 pandemic and uncertainty of another shutdown the following year.

Classes
The Lucas Oil Off Road Racing Series had the following classes: 
 Pro 4 Unlimited: Full-sized 4-wheel-drive race truck, over 700 hp. 
 Pro 2 Unlimited: Full-sized 2-wheel-drive race truck, over 700 hp.
 Pro Lite Unlimited: Mid-sized 2-wheel-drive race truck built on a standardized chassis, over 450 hp. 
 Pro Buggy: Open-wheel buggies with up to 2000 cc motors (dependent on design and manufacturer), 210 hp.
 Production Turbo UTV: Stock 100 cc 2 seat UTV, 130-160 hp.
 Production 1000 UTV: Stock 100 cc 2 seat UTV, 80-110 hp.
 Modified Kart: Advanced kart class utilizing 250 cc or 450 cc 48 hp motorcycle motors; for kids ages 10–15.
 Junior 2 Kart: Intermediate spec kart class utilizing the Honda GX390 390 cc 12 hp motor; for kids ages 8–15.
 Junior 1 Kart: Beginner spec kart class utilizing the Subaru EX27 266 cc 9 hp motor; for kids ages 8–15.
 Limited Buggy: Open-wheel buggies with Type 1 1600 cc VW engines.
 Unlimited UTV: Heavily modified UTV utilizing up to 1000 cc engines.
 SR1 UTV: Heavily modified Yamaha Rhino or Kawasaki Teryx spec class utilizing the Yamaha R1 or Kawasaki  ZX-10 1000 cc street bike motor.
 SuperLite: Spec 2-wheel-drive truck regulated by the SuperLite Championship Series.

Champions

Pro 4 
 2019 Kyle LeDuc
 2018 RJ Anderson
 2017 Kyle LeDuc
 2016 Kyle LeDuc
 2015 Kyle LeDuc
 2014 Kyle LeDuc
 2013 Carl Renezeder 
 2012 Kyle LeDuc
 2011 Carl Renezeder 
 2010 Rick Huseman
 2009 Carl Renezeder

Pro 2 
 2020 Jerett Brooks
 2019 Jerett Brooks
 2018 Rob MacCachren
 2017 Jeremy McGrath
 2016 Rob MacCachren
 2015 Rob MacCachren
 2014 Brian Deegan
 2013 Rob MacCachren 
 2012 Brian Deegan
 2011 Brian Deegan 
 2010 Rob MacCachren
 2009 Carl Renezeder

Pro Lite Unlimited 
 2020 Brock Heger
 2019 Ryan Beat
 2018 Ryan Beat
 2017 Jerett Brooks
 2016 Jerett Brooks
 2015 RJ Anderson
 2014 Sheldon Creed
 2013 Brian Deegan
 2012 R.J. Anderson
 2011 Brian Deegan 
 2010 Marty Hart
 2009 Brian Deegan

Pro Buggy 
 2020 Eliott Watson
 2019 Eliott Watson
 2018 Darren Hardesty
 2017 Darren Hardesty
 2016 Darren Hardesty
 2015 Garrett George
 2014 Chad George
 2013 Steven Greinke
 2012 Steven Greinke
 2011 Mike Porter
 2010 Cameron Steele
 2009 Chuck Cheek

Modified Karts 
 2020 Connor Barry
 2019 Mason Prater - Mod Kids USA
 2018 Brody Eggleston - Mod Kids USA
 2017 Trey D. Gibbs - Mod Kids USA
 2016 Hailie Deegan
 2015 Christopher Polvoorde
 2014 Brock Heger
 2013 Myles Cheek
 2012 Myles Cheek
 2011 Mitchell dejong
 2010 Mitchell dejong
 2009 Sheldon Creed

Junior 2 Karts 
 2020 Brodie Martin
 2019 Broedy Graham
 2018 Connor Barry - Mod Kids USA
 2017 Megan Mitchell
 2015 Cole Keatts
 2014 Dylan Plemons
 2013 Hailie Deegan
 2012 Dylan Winbury
 2011 Myles Cheek
 2010 Sheldon Creed
 2009 Dustin Grabowski

Junior 1 Karts 
 2018 Jake Bollman
 2015 Kali Kinsman
 2014 Mason Prater
 2013 Ricky Gutierrez
 2012 Conner McMullen
 2011 Broc Dickerson
 2010 Brock Heger
 2009 Sheldon Creed

Production 1000 UTV 
 2020 Myles Cheek
 2019 Robert Stout
 2018 Brock Heger	
 2017 Brock Heger

Turbo UTV 
 2020 Corry Weller
 2019 Corry Weller
 2018 Corry Weller

RZR 170 
 2020 TJ Siewers
 2019 George Llamosas

Unlimited UTV 
 2011 RJ Anderson
 2010 Chad George
 2009 Chad George

Super Lite 
 2012 Sheldon Creed
 2011 Chad George
 2010 Jeremy Stenberg
 2009 John Harrah

Limited Buggy 
 2012 John Fitzgerald
 2011 Curt Geer
 2010 Justin Smith
 2009 Bruce Fraley

SR1 UTV 
 2011 Corry Weller
 2010 Tyler Herzog

Modified UTV 
 2009 Dan Kelly

Limited UTV 
 2009 Hans Waage

Tracks
The series has hosted race weekends at the following tracks:
 Wild Horse Motorsports Park - Chandler, Arizona (2010–2020)
 Glen Helen Raceway - San Bernardino, California (2010–2020)
 Lake Elsinore Motorsports Complex - Lake Elsinore, California (2009, 2012–2016)
 Las Vegas Motor Speedway - Las Vegas, Nevada (2010–2015)
 Miller Motorsports Park - Tooele, Utah (2010–2018)
 Primm Valley Motorsports Complex - Primm, Nevada (2009)
 Speedworld Off Road Park - Surprise, Arizona (2009–2012)
 Wild West Motorsports Park - Sparks, Nevada (2012–2019)
 Baja International Short Course at Estero Beach - Ensenada, Baja California (2015-2019)
 Lucas Oil Speedway - Wheatland, Missouri (2017–2020)

Television coverage
For the 2015 season, the Lucas Oil Off Road Racing Series was aired on several different networks with 8 confirmed one-hour episodes in HD on CBS and 32 confirmed HD episodes on both CBS Sports Network and MavTV.

References

External links

Official website

 
Off-road racing series
Recurring events established in 2009
Off Road Racing Series
Defunct auto racing series
Recurring sporting events disestablished in 2020